John Whitmore (July 3, 1844 - February 26, 1918) was an American soldier in the American Civil War and recipient of the Medal of Honor.

Biography 
Whitmore was born in Brown County, Illinois on July 3, 1844. He joined the 119th Illinois Infantry Regiment in Company F and fought as a Private. He earned his medal on Apr 9, 1865 at the Battle of Fort Blakely, Alabama. He died on February 26, 1918, in New London, Iowa.

Medal of Honor Citation 
For extraordinary heroism on 9 April 1865, in action at Fort Blakely, Alabama, for capture of flag.

References 

1844 births
1918 deaths
American Civil War recipients of the Medal of Honor
People of Illinois in the American Civil War